Joost Röben is a St. Maartener international footballer who plays as a forward.

Club career
In 2013, Röben signed for SV Independiente Caravel of the Division Uno, the second tier of football on Aruba, shortly after arriving on the island from the Netherlands. On the penultimate matchday of the season, Röben scored two goals in a 3–1 victory over Racing Club Savaneta to guarantee Caravel's first-place league finish and return to the Division di Honor for the following season.

International career
Röben made his international debut for Sint Maarten in a friendly against Anguilla on 13 March 2016. He scored his first two international goals in the eventual 2–0 victory. The match was Sint Maarten's first senior international in over ten years and was played in preparation for each side's 2017 Caribbean Cup qualification campaigns which were set to begin the following week.

International goals
Scores and results list Sint Maarten's goal tally first.

International career statistics

Personal
Röben is from the town of Epe, Netherlands.

References

External links
 Caribbean Football Database profile
 

Living people
Dutch Antillean footballers
Association football forwards
Sint Maarten international footballers
SV Independiente Caravel players
Year of birth missing (living people)
Footballers from Gelderland